The 2016 San Diego State Aztecs football team represented San Diego State University in the 2016 NCAA Division I FBS football season. The Aztecs were led by sixth-year head coach Rocky Long and played their home games at Qualcomm Stadium. They were members of the West Division of the Mountain West Conference. They finished the season 11–3, 6–2 in Mountain West play to be champions of the West Division. They represented the West Division in the Mountain West Championship Game where they defeated Wyoming to be crowned Mountain West champions for the second consecutive year. They were invited to the Las Vegas Bowl where they defeated Houston.

Schedule

Schedule source:

Personnel

Roster

Coaching Staff

Game summaries

New Hampshire

California

at Northern Illinois

at South Alabama

UNLV

at Fresno State

San Jose State

at Utah State

Hawaii

at Nevada

at Wyoming

Colorado State

at Wyoming–Mountain West Championship Game

Houston–Las Vegas Bowl

Rankings

References

San Diego State
San Diego State Aztecs football seasons
Mountain West Conference football champion seasons
Las Vegas Bowl champion seasons
San Diego State Aztecs football